Mavi in Iran, may refer to:
 Mavi, Hamadan
 Mavi, Razavi Khorasan